Alton Minor Coppage (February 9, 1916 – January 9, 1992) was a professional American football end who played five seasons in the National Football League (NFL) and All-America Football Conference (AAFC), mostly for the Chicago Cardinals. Coppage grew up in Oklahoma and attended the University of Oklahoma, where he was part of a 1938 football team that won the school's first Big Six Conference championship. He was drafted by the NFL's Cardinals in 1940 and played in Chicago for three seasons before leaving to serve in World War II. He signed with the Cleveland Browns in the AAFC after his discharge from the military and played one season for the team, moving to the Buffalo Bills in 1947. After leaving football, Coppage settled in Oklahoma and worked in lumber and banking. He died in 1992.

Career

Coppage grew up in Hollis, Oklahoma and attended the University of Oklahoma in Norman. He played football as an end for the Oklahoma Sooners for three years starting as a sophomore in 1937. Coppage was a member of a 1938 Sooners team that went undefeated and was ranked fourth in the country by the Associated Press before losing in the Orange Bowl to Tennessee. Despite the bowl-game loss, the Sooners won their first-ever Big Six Conference championship.

Coppage was selected by the Chicago Cardinals in the 1940 NFL Draft and played for the team for three seasons before leaving to serve in the Pacific theater of World War II. After returning from service as a corporal in the Twentieth Air Force, he was acquired in 1946 by the Cleveland Browns, a team under formation in the All-America Football Conference. In his one year with the Browns, the team won the league championship. Coppage played for the Buffalo Bills in 1947, his last year in professional football.

Later life and death

After retiring from football, Coppage worked in the lumber business and subsequently in banking, spending 20 years as first vice president of First State Bank of Gould, Oklahoma for 20 years. The bank was robbed in 1975 when Coppage was working there with his wife Lillian, an assistant cashier. Two bearded men entered the bank and pistol-whipped Coppage and another bank executive. They stole $300 and abducted two female employees, took them to an abandoned garage and shot both in the head and face; one of them died. Two men were apprehended and charged with the crime.

Coppage died in 1992 at Jackson County Memorial Hospital in Altus, Oklahoma.

References

Bibliography

External links

 Playing statistics at Pro Football Reference

1916 births
1992 deaths
People from Hollis, Oklahoma
Oklahoma Sooners football players
American football wide receivers
Cleveland Browns (AAFC) players
People from Pilot Point, Texas
United States Army Air Forces personnel of World War II
United States Army Air Forces soldiers
Robberies in the United States